A Holy Lie is a philosophical concept coined by Friedrich Nietzsche in his late notes. It is also mentioned in his book The Antichrist.

Sources 
In Nietzsche's late notes, the idea of a holy lie occurs in two contexts: "the critique of religion" and "the critique of morality".

Concept 
A holy lie, according to Friedrich Nietzsche, is the means by which priests and philosophers obtain the piety of their audiences.

Nietzsche argues that the purpose of human action is altered by the holy lie since the original moral standards of the general public is influenced by the moral standards preached by the priests and philosophers. Consequently, the human faculty of moral judgment based on the "beneficial" versus the "harmful" is in dysfunction. People who accept the holy lie do not evaluate the fairness of a thing by what Nietzsche calls "The natural notion". Instead, the notions, standards and doctrines preached by the preachers(priests and philosophers) substitutes the natural notion.

In his book The Antichrist, Nietzsche further explains his idea with an example of Paul the Apostle and the downfall of the Roman empire.

References 

Philosophy of Friedrich Nietzsche
Criticism of Christianity
Criticism of religion